Natsagiin Jantsannorov (born 25 March 1949) is a Mongolian composer.

Works
Jantsannorov Natsag: Gobi Of Turquoise Treasure; Morin Khuur Ensemble of Mongolia 2015
Natsag Jantsannorov: Guardian Spirit of the Saint; Morin Khuur Ensemble of Mongolia 2012
Jantsannorov Natsag: Blue Melody of Dornod, Various artists 2011
Jantsannorov Natsag: Little Night Melodies, Jambalsuren Agvaantseren, Amarbayar Renchin & Javzandulam Shargaa 2006
Singing My Endless Love, No.2, Various artists 2004
Let the Mount Burkhan Khaldun Bless You, Jantsannorov Natsag 1998
Eternal Power of the Sky, Jantsannorov Natsag 1992 
Queen Mandukhai, the Wise, Jantsannorov Natsag 1988

References

Historical dictionary of Mongolia

https://music.yandex.com/label/246227

Mongolian composers
People's Artists of Mongolia
1948 births
Living people